Firouzeh may refer to:

Firouzeh Vokhshouri, former princess of Jordan
Firouzeh Palace in Tehran
 Firuzeh, Razavi Khorasan Province, Iran